Inodrillia hesperia is a species of sea snail, a marine gastropod mollusk in the family Horaiclavidae.

It was previously included within the family Turridae.

Description
The length of the shell varies between 7 mm and 15 mm.

Distribution
This marine species occurs off the Florida Keys, USA, and in the Caribbean Sea off Venezuela at depths between 201 and 263 m.

References

 Bartsch P., A Review of Some West Atlantic Turritid Mollusks. Memorias de la Sociedad Cubana de Historia Natural, 17 (2):81-122, plates 7-15

External links
 Rosenberg G., Moretzsohn F. & García E. F. (2009). Gastropoda (Mollusca) of the Gulf of Mexico, Pp. 579–699 in Felder, D.L. and D.K. Camp (eds.), Gulf of Mexico–Origins, Waters, and Biota. Biodiversity. Texas A&M Press, College Station, Texas
  Tucker, J.K. 2004 Catalog of recent and fossil turrids (Mollusca: Gastropoda). Zootaxa 682:1–1295.
 

hesperia